The Önningeby artists' colony was founded in 1886 by Victor Westerholm, a Finnish landscape painter, who had a summer house in the village of Önningeby in Åland in the Baltic Sea. It attracted Finnish and Swedish artists who gathered in the summer to paint landscapes en plein air rather than in their studios. Many of the participating artists were women.

Background
In the 1870s, European artists began to develop an interest in painting outdoors rather than in their studios. Formal approaches to landscape painting gave way to more realistic or naturalistic depictions, often reflecting the effects of changing light. Throughout Europe, artists began to gather each summer in villages where they could work together in pleasant surroundings. Artists from across Scandinavia met above all in Skagen in the north of Denmark from the early 1880s, forming a group which became known as the Skagen Painters.

In the mid-1880s, the Finnish Impressionist painter Victor Westerholm from Turku bought Tomtebo, a little summer house beside the Lemström Canal in the village of Önningeby to the northeast of Mariehamn. While studying in Düsseldorf, he had met Anders August Jansson (1859–1882) from Åland who encouraged him to visit the islands in 1880. In 1885, he exhibited paintings at the Helsinki salon including October day on Åland. From 1886, he invited his artist friends to join him there each summer to paint in the open air. Their works included marine landscapes and village scenes as well as portraits of the local inhabitants. They also painted each other.

Participants
Many of the artists who painted in Önningeby were women. The first group of artists to join Westerholm included Fredrik Ahlstedt and his wife Nina, Aleksander Federley, Hanna Rönnberg and Elin Danielson, all of whom were Finns. The Swedish painter J.A.G. Acke also participated the first year, becoming one of the group's most important figures returning each year until 1892 when interest began to fade. Other painters who joined the group in subsequent years include the Finns Elias Muukka, Elin Alfhild Nordlund, Helmi Sjöstrand and Dora Wahlroos, and the Swedes Ida Gisiko, Anna Wengberg, Eva Topelius, and Edvard Westman. Ellen Favorin and Amélie Lundahl visited in 1889.

One of the most important members of the group was Hanna Rönnberg. She first visited in 1886 and returned year after year. Both a writer and a painter, she contributed to the colony's success by including it in her fictional and non-fictional writings. Her paintings often included people, her best works appearing around 1890, some achieving success at exhibitions. Thereafter she concentrated increasingly on her short story collections including Från Ålands skär and Brovaktens historier. In 1888, Edvard Westman invited her to join him in Denmark. They met in Copenhagen and together visited the artists colony in Skagen. For a time they planned to marry but never did.

Axel Andersson, better known as J.A.G. Acke, was the first Swede to visit the Önningeby where he painted some of his best works during the three summers he was there. He stayed at the Övre Knapans farn where the large dining hall became his studio. He painted portraits of the farm's hostess "Knapans farmor" (Knapan's grandmother) and of Victor Westerholm. He also painted landscapes, inspired by French impressionistic works playing with the effects of sunlight. It was in Önningeby that he met his wife to be, Eva Topelius, daughter of the writer Zacharias Topelius. After their marriage in 1891, they returned to Önningeby in the winter in February 1892. It was there he completed his enormous Snöljus (Snow Light) measuring 4.6 by 1.6 metres which he had hoped to exhibit in Paris, but it was refused.

Museum

Over the years, the artists were accommodated in Önningeby's spacious farmsteads. One of these, the Jonesas farm, was converted into a museum which was opened in 1992 and expanded in 1999. It exhibits paintings by a number of those who gathered in the artists colony.

Gallery of paintings

The gallery presents a selection of paintings by the Önningeby artists.

References

Artist colonies
Finnish artist groups and collectives
History of Åland